Ed Oakley is a municipal politician from Dallas, Texas. He served on the city council from 2001 to 2007, and was a candidate for Mayor of Dallas in the runoff election held on June 16, 2007. If he had won, he would have been the first openly gay mayor of a top ten U.S. city.

In the runoff election, Oakley lost to Tom Leppert by a margin of 58% to 42%.

See also
LGBT rights in Texas

References

Living people
Gay politicians
People from Dallas
Dallas City Council members
American LGBT city council members
LGBT people from Texas
Year of birth missing (living people)